The Cobalt Co50 Valkyrie is a single-engine, four to five-seat homebuilt aircraft, arranged in a canard, pusher configuration. A light aircraft intended for private ownership, it was initially being developed by Cobalt Aircraft of San Francisco, California, United States, but the company ceased operations in July 2018 and the design is now being developed by the Centauri Aircraft Company.

Design
The composite design incorporates retractable landing gear, a pusher engine configuration, a canard, twin vertical stabilizers and automatic airbrakes. A ballistic parachute is provided as an option. Passenger entry is by a large forward fold down door. Kit production is planned to be carried out in the United States.

Initially the Co50 will be sold as a kit for amateur construction, but the manufacturer intends to eventually achieve type certification. Certification is likely to be time-consuming, not least due to the electronics Cobalt has chosen being untested for aircraft use.

Operational history
The company has declined to publish the number of aircraft on order or completed.

In August 2020 there were two Co50s registered in the United States with the Federal Aviation Administration. One was built in 2014 and owned by the then defunct previous manufacturer, Cobalt Aircraft, and flagged by the FAA as "this aircraft's registration status may not be suitable for operation". The second aircraft was built in 2018 and is registered to a private company. By February 2023, there was only one aircraft still registered with the FAA, owned by the Centuri Aircraft Corp.

Accidents
The second prototype Co50 was crashed in September 2017 following a loss of aileron effectiveness in flight on a flight test at Castle Airport. The pilot was landing the aircraft using rudder and thrust only when lift was lost at an altitude of about ten feet. The aircraft impacted the ground, the right main landing gear leg separated and the wing was damaged. The pilot was not hurt.

Specifications (Co50)

References

External links

2010s United States civil utility aircraft
Homebuilt aircraft
Single-engined pusher aircraft
Aircraft first flown in 2015